Technicolor Animation Productions (formerly OuiDo! Productions) was the production arm of Technicolor Creative Studios.

History
On February 25, 2015, Technicolor SA acquired OuiDo! Productions, and renamed the studio "Technicolor Animation Productions". After the Technicolor SA purchase, OuiDo! works were retroactively credited with the new company name and logo, replacing the OuiDo! logo.

It partnered up with American-based Bagdasarian Productions to produce the 2015 series Alvinnn!!! and the Chipmunks with PGS Entertainment distributing.
the show started airing in March 2015 and April 2015 respectively in the United States and United Kingdom on Nickelodeon.

In 2022, due to the spin-off of Technicolor Creative Studios, it, along with Technicolor Animation, were merged into Mikros Image's animation subsidiary Mikros Animation, however, it is still credited on some shows, like Alvinnn!!! and the Chipmunks.

Filmography
 Alvinnn!!! and the Chipmunks (international co-production with Bagdasarian Productions)
 Mini-Wolf
 The Legendaries
 Monchhichi Tribe
 Sonic Boom (international co-production with Sega of America, Inc., Lagardére Thématiques and Jeunesse TV)
 Atomic Puppet (international co-production with Mercury Filmworks)
 The Deep (international co-production with DHX Media)
 Team Dronix (international co-production with France Televisions and Gloob [owned by Canais Globo, in turn owned by Grupo Globo])
 Mickey Mouse Mixed-Up Adventures (animation services)
 Elena of Avalor (animation services, Seasons 2-3)
 Rugrats (animation services)
 Mira, Royal Detective
 The Psammy Show
 Xiaolin Chronicles
 Gus: The Itsy Bitsy Knight
 Spirit Riding Free (animation services)
 Fast & Furious Spy Racers (animation services)
 The Chicken Squad (animation services)
 Mickey Mouse Funhouse (animation services)
 The Croods: Family Tree (animation services)
 Kamp Koral: SpongeBob's Under Years (animation services)
 Gabby's Dollhouse (animation services)
 The Boss Baby: Back in the Crib (animation services)
 Kung Fu Panda: The Dragon Knight (animation services)
 DreamWorks Dragons: The Nine Realms (animation services)

See also
Bagdasarian Productions
PGS Entertainment
Klasky Csupo
United Plankton Pictures
Disney Television Animation

References

External links
Official website

French animation studios
Television production companies of France
Technicolor Creative Studios